Paracolax tristalis, the clay fan-foot, is a litter moth of the family Erebidae. The species was first described by Johan Christian Fabricius in 1794. It is found in the Palearctic realm.

The ground colour is warm sandy brown and the forewing has entire subbasal and postmedian lines. The wingspan is 28–35 mm. The moth flies from June to August depending on the location.
 
The larvae feed on various shrubs and deciduous trees.

External links

"Paracolax tristalis (Fabricius, 1794)". Fauna Europaea. Retrieved 28 January 2020.
"Paracolax tristalis (Fabricius, 1794)". Lepidoptera of Belgium. Archived 12 May 2017.
"08839 Paracolax tristalis (Fabricius, 1794) - Trübgelbe Spannereule". Lepiforum e.V. Retrieved 28 January 2020. 
"Gele snuituil Paracolax tristalis". De Vlinderstichting. Retrieved 28 January 2020. 
"Subfamily: Herminiinae (5G 9S)". British Lepidoptera. Retrieved 28 January 2020.

Herminiinae
Moths of Japan
Moths of Europe
Moths of Asia
Taxa named by Johan Christian Fabricius
Moths described in 1794